Apparat Organ Quartet is the debut album of the Icelandic band Apparat Organ Quartet. It was originally released in 2002 on the Thule Records label in Iceland; in 2005, this self-titled album was re-released on the Icelandic 12 Tónar label in a remastered version. The cover and liner notes contain several paintings of the band members as figures resembling those of Playmobil.

Track listing
"Romantika" — 4:44
"The Anguish Of Space Time" — 6:10
"Cruise Control" — 3:38
"Ondula Nova" — 5:27
"Global Capital" — 5:23
"Stereo Rock & Roll" — 4:17
"Seremonia" — 5:00
"Charlie Tango #2" — 7:24
"Sofðu Litla Vél" — 5:29

External links 
Apparat Organ Quartet on Gogoyoko.

References

2000 albums